Claude Parisot (c. 1704 in Étain – 3 March 1784 in Étain) was a French organ builder. He came from a family of organ builders: his nephew Henri in turn built and repaired many instruments in Lower Normandy and Maine. He learned his art with Moucherel of Lorraine, then in 1727 with Louis-Alexandre and Jean-Baptiste Clicquot in Paris.

Beginning in 1735, Parisot built numerous organs in northern and western France:
 1736 Church of St Rémy, Dieppe, restored and currently used by the École Nationale de Musique. Numerous recordings available.
 1741 Premonstratensian abbey of Mondaye (near Bayeux)
 1747 Notre-Dame de Guibray, Falaise
 Premonstratensian abbey of Séry-aux-Prés (Seine-Maritime)
 Church of St George and Church of the Holy Sepulchre at Abbeville 
 Sées Cathedral
 Ardenne Abbey (near Caen)
 Jacobin convent, Caen
 Abbey of St André en Gouffern (near Falaise)

1704 births
1784 deaths
French pipe organ builders
French musical instrument makers